In mathematics, Legendre's equation is the Diophantine equation

The equation is named for Adrien-Marie Legendre who proved in 1785 that it is solvable in integers x, y, z, not all zero, if and only if
−bc, −ca and −ab are quadratic residues modulo a, b and c, respectively, where a, b, c are nonzero, square-free, pairwise relatively prime integers, not all positive or all negative .

References
 L. E. Dickson, History of the Theory of Numbers.  Vol.II: Diophantine Analysis, Chelsea Publishing, 1971, .  Chap.XIII, p. 422.
 J.E. Cremona and D. Rusin, "Efficient solution of rational conics", Math. Comp., 72 (2003) pp. 1417-1441.  

Diophantine equations